Merrill City Hall is located in Merrill, Wisconsin. It was added to the National Register of Historic Places in 1978.

History
When it originally opened, the building housed a jail and the T.B. Scott Free Library in addition to the city offices.

It was listed in the National Register of Historic Places in 1978.  The city hall moved to a newer location in 1977. 

Currently, the building serves as a apartment complex known as the Merrill City Hall Apartments. It still incorporates many of the historical elements of the building into the design of the individual apartment units.

References

City and town halls on the National Register of Historic Places in Wisconsin
City halls in Wisconsin
Apartment buildings in Wisconsin
Buildings and structures in Lincoln County, Wisconsin
Queen Anne architecture in Wisconsin
Government buildings completed in 1889
National Register of Historic Places in Lincoln County, Wisconsin